Pietro Fasoli (born 25 October 1891, date of death unknown) was an Italian racing cyclist. He rode in the 1919 Tour de France.

References

External links
 

1891 births
Year of death missing
Italian male cyclists
Place of birth missing
Cyclists from the Province of Bergamo